(born February 22, 1982 in Izumiōtsu, Osaka) is a Japanese singer, lyricist, composer and actress.

Her career started in the early 2000s with the band , where she served as vocalist and guitarist. After it broke up in 2003, she joined punk jazz group Midori together with Usagi's bassist, Yoshifumi Kuwano. Midori released three full-length albums, five EPs, and a single. After its dissolution, Gotō focused on her solo career as a musician, as well as a stage, film, and television drama actress. In 2013, she provided vocals and lyrics for the opening song of the anime Flowers of Evil which is titled "宇宙人" (ep. 4–6, "Aku no Hana -Nakamura Sawa-"). Her song "Sound of Me" was used as the ending theme of the drama Taberu Dake, where she played the lead role.
In May 2016 it was reported that she decided to quit the music industry. She returned at the end of 2018 with a demo EP, following it with a full-length album in 2019, both under the alias DJ510Mariko.

Discography

Album 
 299792458 (2012)
 m@u (2013)
 こわれた箱にりなっくす (2014)

Single 
 "Sound of Me" (2013)

As DJ510Mariko 
 DEMO (EP 2018)
 Gainsbourg  ni Aisarete (2019)
 love punk (EP 2020)
fuckin' kill you (EP 2021)

With Midori

With Usagi 
  (EP, 2003)

Acting 
 Hedwig and the Angry Inch (2012)
 Petal Dance (2013)
 Taberu Dake (2013)

References

External links 
 Official site (2013)
 Official site
 Sony Music Japan
 Twitter (@510marik0)
 Facebook (@510yavai)

1982 births
Japanese women rock singers
Japanese lyricists
Japanese rock guitarists
Japanese songwriters
Living people
People from Izumiōtsu, Osaka
Musicians from Osaka Prefecture
21st-century Japanese guitarists
21st-century Japanese women musicians
21st-century women guitarists